Basantapur railway station is a railway station on the East Coast Railway network in the state of Odisha, India. It serves Basantapur village. Its code is BSTP. It has two platforms. Passenger, MEMU, Express trains halt at Basantapur railway station.

Major trains

 Puri–Barbil Express

See also
 Kendujhar district

References

Railway stations in Kendujhar district
Khurda Road railway division